Heaven's Prisoners is a 1996 American dramatic crime thriller film directed by Phil Joanou and starring Alec Baldwin, Kelly Lynch, Mary Stuart Masterson, Teri Hatcher and Eric Roberts. It is based on a Dave Robicheaux homonymous novel by James Lee Burke. Harley Peyton and Scott Frank wrote the screenplay.

The film was followed by In the Electric Mist (2009), starring Tommy Lee Jones as Dave Robicheaux. In the sequel, Robicheaux still lives in Louisiana and has come out of retirement as an Iberia Parish sheriff's detective.

Plot
A former police detective and Vietnam veteran in New Orleans and a recovering alcoholic, Dave Robicheaux, is living a quiet life in the swamplands of Louisiana with his wife Annie. The couple's tranquility is shattered one day when a drug smuggler's plane crashes in a lake, right before their eyes.

Robicheaux succeeds in rescuing a lone survivor from drowning, a young Salvadoran female, whom Annie quickly pulled up onto the boat to administer mouth-to-mouth by covering the little girl’s nostrils with her right cheek while breathing into her airway. With the arrival of a DEA officer named Dautrieve and an inherent connection to Bubba Rocque, the leading drug kingpin in the area and Robicheaux's longtime friend from New Iberia, Dave becomes involved in solving the case and consequently finds himself, his wife, and their new adoptive daughter Alafair in danger.

Robicheaux is assaulted by two thugs as a warning. With help from his former girlfriend Robin, an exotic dancer who still has feelings for him, he continues to investigate. His longtime acquaintance Bubba denies any involvement, but Dave warns him and Bubba's sultry wife Claudette that he is going to find out who is behind all this and do something about it. He tracks down one of the men who attacked him, Eddie Keats, and splits his head open with a pool cue in Keat's own bar. Killers come to the Robicheaux home late one night. Robicheaux is unable to prevent his wife Annie from being killed. He falls off the wagon and neglects the young girl they adopted. Robin comes to stay with them.

Clearing his head, Robicheaux seeks vengeance against the three killers. He first goes after a large man called Toot, chasing him onto a streetcar and causing his death. Bubba and Claudette reassure a local mob boss named Giancano that they will not let this vendetta get out of hand, and Bubba gets into a fistfight with Robicheaux, falsely suspecting him of an affair with Claudette. Eddie Keats is found dead before Robicheaux can get to him. Going after the last and most dangerous of the killers, Victor Romero, he knows that someone else must be giving them orders.

He finds Romero and kills him. Then, going to Bubba's home, Robicheaux discovers that it is Claudette who planned the hit. After overhearing Claudette confessing her plan to take over the drug business, Bubba appears and shoots Claudette, and Robicheaux calls in the crime. When he returns home, Robin has left forever, and all Robicheaux has left in his life is his daughter Alafair.

Cast
 Alec Baldwin as Dave Robicheaux
 Kelly Lynch as Annie Robicheaux
 Mary Stuart Masterson as Robin Gaddis
 Teri Hatcher as Claudette Rocque
 Eric Roberts as Bubba Rocque
 Vondie Curtis-Hall as Minos P. Dautrieve
 Hawthorne James as Victor Romero
 Badja Djola as Batist
 Joe Viterelli as Didi Giancano
 Paul Guilfoyle as Detective Magelli
 Don Stark as Eddie Keats
 Carl A. McGee as "Toot"
 Jacob "Tuck" Milligan as Jerry "Fallout"
 Samantha Lagpacan as Alafair
 Patricia Huston as Older Nun

Production
Teri Hatcher recalled a funny situation that happened while she was shooting her frontal nude scene on a balcony. "We were shooting at a beautiful old plantation house which is also a popular museum in New Orleans," said Teri. "I had been doing the scene all afternoon. I was standing on the balcony and I walked past these huge glass doors. Out of the corner of my eye I saw about 20 men and women in their seventies, just standing, staring at me as I walked past them completely naked. All I could do was burst into laughter. They were on a museum tour - caught in the wrong place at the wrong time."

Reception
The film opened in fifth place grossing $2,308,797 its opening weekend playing in a total of 907 theaters at its widest point. However the film was a box office failure, grossing only $5,009,305, far below its $25,000,000 budget. The film also received generally negative reviews with a 16% "rotten" rating on Rotten Tomatoes based on 19 reviews. Teri Hatcher's performance earned her a Golden Raspberry Award nomination for Worst Supporting Actress.

References

External links
 

1996 films
1996 crime drama films
1996 independent films
1990s psychological thriller films
American crime drama films
American independent films
American erotic thriller films
Films about murder
American films about revenge
Films based on American novels
Films based on crime novels
Films directed by Phil Joanou
Films with screenplays by Scott Frank
Films scored by George Fenton
Films set in Louisiana
Films shot in New Orleans
Savoy Pictures films
1990s English-language films
1990s American films